Mike Holoway (born 28 January 1961 in Dagenham, Essex, England) is a British musician and actor. He was the drummer and percussionist in Flintlock and at the same time became an actor, notably in the cult TV series The Tomorrow People.

Career 
He was taught to play the drums at the age of five by his grandfather and, at eight, he joined a stage school to pursue an acting career. He gained his secondary school education at Erkenwald Comprehensive School in the London Borough of Barking and Dagenham. He also studied music theory, percussion and drums at the Barking & Essex College of Music and played in the Essex Jazz Band.  His first stage appearance was as Boy Babe in Babes in the Wood at the London Palladium with Edward Woodward and Derek Nimmo.

At ten, he made his first TV appearance with the Young Revivals – two years later they changed their name to Flintlock. Comprising Mike Holoway, Derek Pascoe, John Summerton, Bill Rice and Jamie Stone, the group made numerous TV appearances on programmes such as Blue Peter, Magpie, You Must Be Joking, Pauline's Quirkes, Fanfare and Top of the Pops. Holoway was awarded the TV Times Personality of the Year award in 1976.

In 1984, he had a starring role in the Minder episode "A Star is Gorn" in which he played Zac Zolar, a pop star tired of his fame who fakes his death so as he may be rid of the corrupt influence of his agent.

From 1985, Holoway toured in Joseph and the Amazing Technicolor Dreamcoat, one of the most successful runs of the musical. Since then, Holoway has appeared in a number of stories in The Tomorrow People audio series, released during the 2000s on CD. In 2007, Flintlock reunited for a one-off gig. In early 2018, Holoway announced the impending release of a new 13-track album. The lead single, "Tides of Love", was released on 9 February 2018.

He has two children.

Discography
Flintlock:

Solo singles:
"Overnight" (June 1981)
"Come Go With Me" (November 1981)
"Here I Am" (August 1983)
"Don't Let Life Get You Down" (November 1983)
"Tides of Love" (February 2018)

Solo albums:
Fun City (1990)
In the Heat of the Moment (1991) (re-issued as Fun City on CD)
TBA (2018)

Album contributions:
Smike (1983)
Humpty Dumpty (December 1984)
Joseph And The Amazing Technicolor Dreamcoat (December 1986)
Stop The World, I Want To Get Off (1995)
Simply Musicals(1995) performing "What Kind of Fool Am I"
Timeless Generations (1995) performing "You've Lost That Loving Feeling" with Paul Shane

Filmography
You Must Be Joking (Series 1: 28 May to 16 July 1975, participation from Mike Holoway and musical performances by Flintlock)
 The Tomorrow People (Holoway starred as Mike Bell; 28 January 1976 to 19 February 1979)
Arrows (Flintlock appeared on the edition broadcast 27 April 1976)
You Must Be Joking (Series 2: 23 April to 4 June 1976, participation from Mike Holoway and musical performances by Flintlock)
Top of the Pops (Flintlock, performing "Dawn"; 10 June 1976)
Pauline's Quirkes (Flintlock appeared in six episodes: 15 November - 20 December 1976)
Fanfare (Series 1: 5 August to 9 September 1977, presented by Flintlock who also gave musical performances)
The Basil Brush Show (with Flintlock; 3 December 1977)
Whodunnit? (Holoway appeared in the episode, Instant Coffee, 5 June 1978)
Fanfare (Series 2: 16 June to 28 July 1978, presented by Flintlock who also gave musical performances)
Get It Together (Flintlock were musical guests on the programme; 1 December 1981)
Minder (Holoway appeared as Zac Zolar/Albert Trout/Alan Trent in the episode A Star is Gorn; 22 February 1984)
T-Bag and the Revenge of the T-Set (Holoway appeared as Ricky Romero; 7 February 1989)

Theatre
 Babes in the Wood as Boy Babe
1979, Joseph and the Amazing Technicolor Dreamcoat as Joseph
1980, Godspell as Jesus
Grease as Danny Zuko
1981, Dick Whittington as Dick
1982–1983, The Pirates of Penzance as back-up singer and played Frederic with Oliver Tobias Gill Gascoine Ronald Frazer Pamela Stephenson 
West End National Tour playing Joseph in Joseph and the Anazing Technicolour Dreamcoat and cast album 1980 1985 86 87 88 1996 1998 2000 2006,Record  breaking Joseph having played the role more times than anyone, and over the longest period of time 
1984, Humpty Dumpty as Tommy Tucker
1985–1988, Joseph and the Amazing Technicolor Dreamcoat as Joseph (West End and National tour)
1988, One Careful Owner as Frankie Boyle
1988, Dick Whittington as Dick
1989, Hold Tight It's '60s Night as Rock Hard
1989, The Pirates of Penzance as The Pirate King
1989, Babes in the Wood as Robin
1990, Hold Tight It's '60s Night as Rock Hard
1990, Godspell as Jesus
1990–1991, Snow White and the Seven Dwarfs as The Prince
1992, Robin – Prince of Sherwood as Robin Hood
1992–1993, Snow White and the Seven Dwarfs as Prince Danilo
1993, Robin – Prince of Sherwood as Robin Hood
1995 Twist and Shout as Steve
1995–1996, Cinderella as Prince Charming
1999, Joseph and the Amazing Technicolor Dreamcoat as Joseph
2000/2001, Rock 'N' Roll Rollercoaster
2004, Joseph and the Amazing Technicolor Dreamcoat as Joseph
2005–2006, Snow White and the Seven Dwarfs
2006–2007, Sleeping Beauty as The Prince
2007, Snow White and the Seven Dwarfs as The Prince
2007, Stardust
2007, 007 Bond in Heaven
2007–2008: Sleeping Beauty as Prince Galiant/Valiant
2014 Babes in the Wood Will Scarlet Canno and Ball 
2017 Snow White Leeds open air Christmas show Directed 
2018 one man show Crazy Coqs London 
Presenter 2ndcityradio.net own show produced written by Mike Holoway Sunday's 8-11pm Mike Holoway Digital World Sunday Show with star guests 
Simanagment.com artist and director with Simon Keenan 
2020 Jack and the Beanstalk as King Crumble at the cresset cambridgeshire

References

External links

1961 births
Living people
People from Dagenham
English drummers
British male drummers
English male singers
English male musical theatre actors